Erythraea or Erythraia may refer to:
Eritrea
Erythraea (Crete), a town of ancient Crete, Greece
Erythraea (genus), a synonym for Centaurium, a plant genus in the family Gentianaceae

See also 
 Erythraean (disambiguation)
 Erythrae (disambiguation)